Yanzi or Yan Zi may refer to:

Persons with the name
 Yan Hui (521? – 481 BC), disciple of Confucius known honorifically as Yanzi (顏子)
 Yan Yan (disciple of Confucius) (506 – ? BC), known honorifically as Yanzi (言子)
 Yan Ying (c. 578 – 500 BC), known honorifically as Yanzi (晏子)
 Stefanie Sun (孫燕姿 born 1978) or Sun Yan Zi, Singaporean singer
 Yan Zi (tennis) (晏紫) (born 1984), Chinese tennis player

Other uses
Yanzi River (from 燕子 yànzi "swallow")
Yanzi Mountain 甘肃崦嵫
 Yanzi chunqiu, a Warring States period philosophical work
 Yan Zi (album), an album by Stefanie Sun
 Yanzi people, an ethnic group of Congo
 Yanzi language, a Bantu language

See also
 Yangzi (disambiguation)